Burns Blue are a British hard rock group formed by former Ultravox singer Sam Blue and former Dare/Ten guitarist Vinny Burns. Joining the project was FM drummer Pete Jupp and Wishbone Ash bassist Bob Skeat. Blue and Burns had first worked together when they were both in Ultravox. Blue has also performed on Burns' solo album The Journey.

Discography

What If... (2003)

Track listing
All songs written by Sam Blue/Vinny Burns.
 "Cool Me Down" – 5:12
 "Straight" – 3:56
 "Deadly Sin" – 4:02
 "Don't Wanna Know" – 3:32
 "Lover's Game" – 5:25
 "I'm Gonna Win" – 4:57
 "Crazy" – 4:07
 "She Wrote" – 5:03
 "Tomorrow Never Comes" – 5:13
 "To One Side" – 3:33
 "Hung Out to Dry" – 3:17
 "Where Are You Now" – 5:06

Personnel
Vinny Burns – guitars and keyboards
Sam Blue – vocals
Bob Skeat – bass guitar
Pete Jupp – drums
Tom Kelly - saxophone

Production
Mixing – Pete Coleman
Engineer – Pete Coleman

References

External links
Heavy Harmonies review
GRTR review

English hard rock musical groups